Pra&apos; (elision of the original Latin name Prata Veituriorum) is a district of the west of Genoa, located between Pegli and Voltri with which it forms the western (Ponente) district of Genoa, Municipio VII.

The inhabitants of Pra' are called pràesi: however, those who have originated in the locality for generations prefer to be called praíno (in Genoese dialect: praín).

Pra' was an autonomous municipality from 1797 to 1926, and was divided into five hamlets called casali: Torre, Pra' (later Borgo Foce), Sapello, Palmaro and Palmaro Carbone. With the creation of Greater Genoa by the incorporation of nineteen municipalities during the fascist regime, from 1926 Pra' was added to the municipality of Genoa.

References

External links 

Quartieri of Genoa
Former municipalities of the Province of Genoa